Richard Marshe  was a 17th-century English priest.

Marshe was born at Finchampstead and educated at Queens' College, Cambridge. He was ordained in 1609. he became vicar of Birstall in 1614. He was a chaplain to Charles the First, a JP and a prebendary of Southwell Minster. He was Archdeacon of York from 1641; and dean of York from 1643, although he was not actually installed until after The Restoration. He was also vicar of Halifax.

Marshe died on 13 October 1663.

References

Alumni of Queens' College, Cambridge
Archdeacons of York
17th-century English people
1663 deaths
Deans of York
People from Finchampstead